Michael "Sarge" Pollock is an American politician serving as a member of the Kentucky House of Representatives from the 51st district. He assumed office on November 29, 2021.

Background 
Pollock earned a Bachelor of Science degree Campbellsville University. Since 2001, he has worked as an insurance risk advisor for Jessie Insurance of Central Kentucky. He was elected to the Kentucky House of Representatives in November 2021.

References 

Living people
Republican Party members of the Kentucky House of Representatives
Campbellsville University alumni
Insurance agents
21st-century American politicians
Year of birth missing (living people)